CKRY may refer to:

CKRY-FM
Central Kansas Railway